Ian Roberts (born 30 November 1951) is a South African actor, playwright and singer. A native English speaker, he is also fluent in Afrikaans and Xhosa.

Early life
Roberts was born in Fort Beaufort in the Eastern Cape Province and grew up on his father's citrus farm near the town. He attended St. Andrew's Preparatory School and St. Andrew's College in Grahamstown. After completing high school he performed his compulsory national service in the South African Army, which he completed in 1971.

After a variety of different jobs and a course in photography at the Port Elizabeth Technical College from 1973 to 1975, Roberts enrolled at Rhodes University in 1976 for a Bachelor of Arts degree majoring in speech, drama and social anthropology.

Acting career
Roberts became a South African icon when he played the character of Boet in a long-running series of television advertisements for Castrol motor oil. This character (together with the other characters Swaer and Moegoe) has also been featured in M-Net's comedy series Kalahari Oasis as well as in his Radio Kalahari Orkes band.

In the Oscar-winning South African film, Tsotsi, Roberts played the role of a police captain.

He was married to South African actress Michelle Botes, but the couple divorced in 1999. They had two children.

Filmography

In addition to the above, Roberts has played the leading role in Afrikaans language television series such as Sloet Steenkamp in Arende ("Eagles") and Jack Degenaar in Arsenaal ("Arsenal"), as well as a supporting role in Kwelaman (1986). He has also written a number of scripts, such as Honeytown 1 and the musical Palang van Dwaal ("Palang from Dwaal").

References

External links
 
 Crawford College, Sandton official site

1952 births
Living people
People from Raymond Mhlaba Local Municipality
South African people of British descent
White South African people
South African male television actors
Rhodes University alumni
Burmah-Castrol
Alumni of St. Andrew's College, Grahamstown
South African male film actors